Hélène Breschand (born 18 March 1966) is a French harpist, composer and improviser. Breschand leads a career both as a solo artist as well as in ensemble work, playing both a contemporary repertoire and premiering new works as much as she plays improvised music and musical theater. She is a musician who plays on the verge of several genres ranging from contemporary music to jazz. She plays both written and improvised music.

Family 
She was born to the painters Thérèse Boucraut and Maurice Breschand in Paris. Her brother is the director Jean Breschand. She is the niece of singers Jacqueline and Roger Leroy who participated in the creation of operas composed by Georges Aperghis and directed by Pierre Barrat.

Life and career 
Born in Paris into a family of artists, she discovered contemporary music during the serial music movement, and discovered free jazz and the expansion of new technologies as early as the 1970s.

She began learning harp with Martine Géliot, before deciding to continue with Brigitte Sylvestre, a harpiste who was with Atem and who played with the Greek contemporary composer Georges Aperghis. Ms. Sylvestre initiated her into musical theater and contemporary music. Breschand obtained the "Médaille d'or" and the "Prix d'Excellence" by unanimity at the Conservatoire à Rayonnement Régional of Paris under Brigitte Sylvestre and obtained the "Prize of Analysis" with Christian Acaoui. She teaches harp and gives an improvisation workshop at the conservatory of the 6th arrondissement in Paris and she is regularly invited to give workshops around the world.

She has met and participated in the creation of new works in chamber ensembles and orchestras where she has worked with Luciano Berio, Bernard Cavanna, Pascal Dusapin, Emmanuel Nùnes, François Sarhan… Breschand has also had several pieces for solo harp composed especially for her.

She regularly performs contemporary repertoire by composers such as Georges Aperghis, John Cage, Mauricio Kagel, Luc Ferrari, Jacques Rebotier, Georgia Spiropoulos, Yoshihisa Taïra, Kasper Toeplitz, Tôn-Thât Tîet, David Toop…

She has played both written and improvised music with musicians such as Sophie Agnel, Uriel Barthélémi, Bruno Chevillon, Médéric Collignon, Vincent Courtois, Marc Ducret, Michel Doneda, Michel Godard, Sylvain Kassap, Joelle Léandre, Vincent Le Quang, Thierry Madiot, Jean-Marc Montera, Michael Nick, Annick Nozati, Zeena Parkins, Jean-François Pauvros, Didier Petit, Edith Scob, Elliott Sharp, The Do, Kasper Toeplitz, Franck Vigroux, Wilfried Wendling…

She has often played in museum settings for different exhibitions and installations (Nox, Pierick Sorin.., in museums in Arles, Nantes, Paris, Strasbourg, Troyes…). Her interest in fine arts lead to her collaboration on works by Christian Marclay. Invited by this artist, she interpreted "Graffiti composition" several times as well as played "Shuffle" in several different configurations, such as Screenplay, at la Villette in Paris with Elliot Sharp.

Collaborations 

Breschand has collaborated with artists in multiple artistic disciplines such as fine arts, dance, film, lighting and theater.

She participated in the composition of Bruno Coulais's music for Henry Selick's 3D animated film Coraline'.

She collaborated with the ensembles Transeuropééennes with Pablo Cueco (including the creation of a work by Pablo Cueco with Chaurasia at the Théatre de la Ville), Le Banquet for the premiere of the opera by Bernard Cavanna, Ars Nova, for the reprise of Laborintus II by Luciano Berio as well as with Ensemble 2e2m and Erwartung.

Breschand began playing improvised music thanks to Didier Petit with whom she regularly plays while she played in the ensemble by Denis Colin.

She has had a trio with Didier Petit and Sylvain Kassap and a duo with Jean-François Pauvros for many years.

Breschand is co-founder of the contemporary music ensemble Laborintus with Sylvain Kassap and Franck Masquelier.

From 1999 to 2005, she participated in the creation and was president of the collective Topophonie with Sophie Agnel, Thierry Madiot and Théo Jarrier.

The collective's ambition was to bring artistic experiences into public places, doing sound walks, events and improvisations in outdoor spaces as a way of blurring the distinction between music and life. Pascal Battus, Li-Ping Ting, Dante Feijoo and Sharif Sehnaoui later joined the collective.

She created the show "Double Face" with and for Isabelle Moretti in 2009.

In 2001, she participated in the Ensemble d'Improvisateurs Européens, created by Jean-Marc Montera, who brought together such musicians as Chris Cutler and Thomas Lehn. The ensemble did a tour throughout France and in other countries where they interpreted Treatise by Cornelius Cardew.

Since 1998 (date of the creation of Regard en Abyme for harp and electronics), she has a duo with Wilfried Wendling with whom she develops staged shows with electronics, text and video.

In 2003, she contributed to the creation of the show Le Grand Crwth by François Sarhan and Anja Hempel.

In 2005 she composed the music for the show Ariane(s) with the circus artist Cécile Mont-Reynaud.

Since 2009, she has been developing a duo with the Comeroonian poet and singer Ze Jam Afane.

In 2010 she met the members of the pop band The Do. She played on their second album and continues to collaborate with the lead singer Olivia Merilahti.

In 2011 she participated in the creation of David Toop's opera Star Shaped Biscuit with Elaine Mitchener, Jamie McDermott, Sylvia Hallett, Lore Lixenberg, Allen, Martin Allen, and Jan Hendrickse.

In 2014, Helene started a duo with Kasper Toeplitz, following the creation of a solo piece for harpe and electronics by this composer, at the center for creation GRAME.

In 2013 she began a duo with the video artist Jacques Perconte.

Composer and author 

As a composer, Breschand has developed a semi-graphic compositional style which leaves room for improvisation. She been edited by Billaudot, as well as Misterioso.

She composed the music for the film Le Voile brûlé by Viviane Candas and for the silent films The Passion of Joan of Arc by Carl Theodore Dreyer and Salomé by Charles Bryan. She has also contributed composed music for experimental cinema.

She is the initiator and co-author with Laurence Bancaud, Aurélie Barbé and Mathilde Aubat-Andrieu of the book La Harpe aux XXème et XXIème Siècles, published in 2012 by Minerve Editions.

Selective compositions 

 Fire, electroacoustic piece for harp, voice and radiophonic archives, 2007
 Ô, electroacoustic piece, 2012
 Sleeping woman for solo voice, musical theatre, 2000
 Si Loin, Si Proche, for directed instrumental ensemble, free nomenclature, graphic score, 2013
 L, for instrumental ensemble, free nomenclature (plus audio support), graphic score, 2014
 Soleil Rouge, Lune Folle, for solo alto, 2013
 Minotaure, for solo harpe, 2006
 Improvisation I, II, III, for solo harp, 1998
 Infidélité, for 4 voices, musical theater, 2001
 Délire, for solo voice or accompanied, musical theater, 2010
 A Vos Risques et Périls, solo for harp, musical theater, 2011
 Antre De Jeux, solo or duo, musical theater, free nomenclature, 2011
 Nuit Blanche, harp duo, 2000
 Double Face, harp duo, 2011.

Selective discography 

 "Les Incarnés", solo; voice, acoustic and electric harp, original compositions by Hélène Breschand, label: D'AUTRES CORDES
 "Le Gout Du Sel", Solo; voice, acoustic and electric harp, original compositions by Hélène Breschand, label : D'AUTRES CORDES
 "Hélène Breschand Harpiste Joue", pieces by Berio, Cage, Taïra, Ton-That Tiet and improvisations, label: IN SITU
 "Lascaux Expérience", compositions by Luis Naón, performed by LABORINTUS, label: CÉSARÉ
 "Zodiacales", Based on Les Tierkreis by Karlheinz STOCHKAUSEN, performed by LABORINTUS, label DAPHÉNÉO
 "Et Tournent Les Sons", Compositions by Luc Ferrari, performed by LABORINTUS, label : CÉSARÉ and 
 "Sombre", Duo with Jean-François PAUVROS, label: VICTO
 Double-peine, Duo with Sylvain Kassap, label: D'AUTRES CORDES
 Alpentöne, 2004, with: Michel Godard – serpent, tuba; Linda Bsiri – voice, trumscheit; Christina Zavalloni – voice; Gabrielle Mirabassi – clarinet; Hélène Breschand – harp; Pierre Favre – drums; Calinxtus – gregorian chant (conducted by Gianni di Gennaro).
 "Fleuve", 2003 – with Pierre Favre Ensemble, label : ECM
 "Triste Lilas" by Franck Vigroux, label : D'AUTRES CORDES, 2004
 "Les Incarnés", Vinyl, 2014 – compositions voice and harp Hélène Breschand, label : D'AUTRES CORDES, 2014
 "Austral", d'eRikm by Laborintus, DVD, label : D'AUTRES CORDES, 2012

Collaborations 

 "Hell (A Small Detail)" by François Sarhan, Label: Zig Zag
 "Thisness" by Jef Lee Johnson, Label: Nato
 "De L'Origine Du Monde" by Tony Hymas, Label: Nato

References

External links 

 
 Laborintus
 Les Signes de l'Arc
 Topophonie, archives
 Duo with Wilfried Wendling
 Duo with the circus performer Cécile Mont-Raynaud
 Portrait on France Musique by Anne Montaron
 Interview in Palerma at the 2012 Curva Minore festival

French harpists
20th-century French women musicians
Musicians from Paris
1966 births
Living people
21st-century French women musicians